Matteo Barzotti (born 30 March 1992) is an Italian footballer who plays as a forward for  club Pistoiese.

Club career
On 22 July 2022, Barzotti joined Pistoiese in Serie D.

Personal life
Barzotti was born in Italy to an Italian father and Dominican mother.

Honours

Club 
 Monza
Serie D: 2016-17
Scudetto Dilettanti: 2016-17

References

External links

1992 births
Living people
Sportspeople from the Province of Pesaro and Urbino
Footballers from Marche
Italian footballers
Italian people of Dominican Republic descent
Sportspeople of Dominican Republic descent
Association football forwards
Serie C players
Serie D players
A.C. Milan players
U.S. Folgore Caratese A.S.D. players
U.S.D. Olginatese players
S.C. Caronnese S.S.D. players
A.C. Monza players
U.S. 1913 Seregno Calcio players
A.S.D. Fanfulla players
F.C. Sangiuliano City players
U.S. Pistoiese 1921 players